The Tableau encyclopédique et méthodique des trois regnes de la nature was an illustrated encyclopedia of plants, animals and minerals, notable for including the first scientific descriptions of many species, and for its attractive engravings. It was published in Paris by Charles Joseph Panckoucke, from 1788 on. Although its several volumes can be considered a part of the greater Encyclopédie méthodique, they were titled and issued separately.

Contributors:

 Jean-Baptiste Lamarck (plants, taxonomy)
 Pierre Joseph Bonnaterre (cetaceans, mammals, birds, reptiles, amphibians, fish, insects)
 Louis Jean Pierre Vieillot (birds, second volume)
 Jean Guillaume Bruguière (invertebrates)

Individual prints from this work today can sell for hundreds of dollars (US) apiece.

External links
Cambridge University Library account

References
Christabel P. Braunrot & Kathleen Hardesty Doig, 1995 The Encyclopédie méthodique: an introduction, Studies in Voltaire and the Eighteenth Century, 327 (1995): 1–152. 
Robert Darnton, 1979 The business of Enlightenment: a publishing history of the Encyclopédie Cambridge, Mass.: Bel,knap Press.
George B. Watts,1965 "Thomas Jefferson, the 'Encyclopedie' and the 'Encyclopedie methodique'' French Review 38:318-25.

French encyclopedias
Natural history books
1788 non-fiction books
18th-century encyclopedias
Illustrated books